Arendtsville is a borough in Adams County, Pennsylvania, United States. The population was 867 at the 2020 census.

History
Arendtsville was named for John Arendt, an early settler.

Geography
Arendtsville is located at  (39.924548, -77.297132).

The borough is located near South Mountain, the northern extension of the Blue Ridge Mountain Range.

Demographics

As of the census of 2000, there were 848 people, 329 households, and 242 families residing in the borough. The population density was 1,221.0 people per square mile (474.5/km²). There were 340 housing units at an average density of 489.5 per square mile (190.3/km²). The racial makeup of the borough was 88.80% White, 1.30% African American, 0.12% Native American, 0.24% Asian, 8.61% from other races, and 0.94% from two or more races. Hispanic or Latino of any race were 16.04% of the population.

There were 329 households, out of which 39.2% had children under the age of 18 living with them, 59.3% were married couples living together, 8.2% had a female householder with no husband present, and 26.4% were non-families. 22.8% of all households were made up of individuals, and 13.1% had someone living alone who was 65 years of age or older. The average household size was 2.58 and the average family size was 3.01.

In the borough the population was spread out, with 29.5% under the age of 18, 6.6% from 18 to 24, 29.2% from 25 to 44, 19.2% from 45 to 64, and 15.4% who were 65 years of age or older. The median age was 34 years. For every 100 females there were 101.4 males. For every 100 females age 18 and over, there were 98.0 males.

The median income for a household in the borough was $41,087, and the median income for a family was $43,889. Males had a median income of $28,828 versus $27,813 for females. The per capita income for the borough was $18,256. About 6.3% of families and 10.6% of the population were below the poverty line, including 17.8% of those under age 18 and 1.7% of those age 65 or over.

Education 
The borough is served by the Upper Adams School District. Located in Arendtsville is the district's intermediate school, Upper Adams Intermediate School.

References

External links

1896 establishments in Pennsylvania
Boroughs in Adams County, Pennsylvania
Populated places established in 1810